Boletellus piakaii is a species of fungus in the family Boletaceae. It was found in Guyana and described in 2008.

References

Fungi described in 2008
Fungi of Guyana
piakaii